Sir (Albert) Noel Campbell Macklin (28 October 1886 – 1946) was an innovative British car maker and boat designer. He founded Eric-Campbell in 1919, Silver Hawk in 1920, Invicta in 1925 and Railton in 1933. In 1939 he founded Fairmile Marine and supplied boats to the Royal Navy throughout World War II, for which effort he was honoured with a knighthood.
 
He was the father of sports car and Formula One racing driver Lance Macklin.

Early life and education
Macklin was born in Western Australia, the eldest son of Charles Campbell Macklin (1866–1918), barrister, and his wife, Ada Louisa, née Lockyer (1863/4–1935). The family had moved to Wimbledon, London by 1891 and Macklin was educated at Eton College. He was a successful amateur jockey; from 1908-1910 he represented England and the Princes Ice Hockey Club at ice hockey and in 1909 he raced a Mercedes at Brooklands.

In February 1914 he led an expedition to film big game in the Sudan.

Career

World War 1
Macklin was commissioned into the Royal Field Artillery in 1914, where he served as a captain in the Royal Horse Artillery in the First World War, but was badly wounded in France and invalided out in 1915. Thus he joined the Royal Naval Volunteer Reserve (RNVR) and further served with the Dover Patrol. On his transfer to the RNVR he enlisted Violette Cordery as his driver.

Car manufacture
Macklin was co-founder of the Eric-Campbell car manufacturer in 1919, whose name was a portmanteau of the second names of the founders, thus Campbell. By 1920 Macklin focussed his interest in his new, short lived, Silver Hawk car marque. In 1925 he founded the Invicta car manufacturer (with financial backing from Oliver Lyle) which traded until circa 1935, although by 1933 he was focussed on his new Railton marque.

Boat manufacture
After achieving some fame as a designer of sporty motor cars he turned his attention to motor boats. The Fairmile Engineering Company took its name from Macklin's country estate, Cobham Fairmile in Surrey, where he used the garage for manufacturing and assembly.

In 1939, inspired by an article on the need for small boats for the Royal Navy he founded Fairmile Marine for the design and serial manufacture of small naval boats for the Admiralty. Since the company did not have the necessary capital to meet the Admiralty needs  it became a semi-independent department of the Admiralty  coordinating the supply of parts to build the vessels at boatyards around the country. For the loss of his company Noel was paid a large sum and given a salary.

Fairmile boats provided the Royal Navy with motor boats, gun boats and torpedo boats throughout the Second World War.

WW2 administration
As the war came to the end Macklin was made Director for the disposal of the small boats in RN service.

Family life
In March 1912 Macklin married Esmé Victoria (b. 1887), daughter of Hinton Stewart of Strathgarry, Perthshire, but they were divorced in 1919. His second marriage was to (Lucy) Leslie Cordery (1896–1980), the sister of his RNVR driver Violette Cordery. The Oxford Dictionary of National Biography notes that Lucy's name was variously given as Leslie Lane Cordery and Leslie Cordery Lane, daughter of Henry Lane, farmer. The marriage produced two daughters and a son, Lance Macklin the Formula 1 Racing driver.

Honours
After the war Macklin was knighted for his war effort, although the Admiralty did not return his Cobham site which they had requisitioned.

See also
Violette Cordery - sister-in-law.

References

 Noel Macklin - From Invicta & Railton to the Fairmile Boats by David Thirlbu

External links
  Invicta inventor lives on
 Anti submarine craft

1886 births
1946 deaths
People educated at Eton College
British automobile designers
British Army personnel of World War I
Royal Horse Artillery officers
Royal Navy officers of World War I